Ciarán McDonald (born 11 January 1975) is a Gaelic footballer and coach who formerly played at senior level for the Mayo county team, and still plays his club football for Crossmolina Deel Rovers.

Coaching
McDonald served as coach–selector under the management of James Horan.

References

1975 births
Living people
Crossmolina Gaelic footballers
Gaelic football coaches
Gaelic football forwards
Gaelic football selectors
Irish international rules football players
Mayo inter-county Gaelic footballers
People from Castlebar